Jan Johansson (16 September 1931 – 9 November 1968) was a Swedish jazz pianist. His album Jazz på svenska (Jazz in Swedish) is the best selling jazz release ever in Sweden; it has sold over a quarter of a million copies and has been streamed more than 50 million times on Spotify. He was the father of former HammerFall drummer Anders Johansson and Stratovarius keyboardist Jens Johansson, who run Heptagon Records which keeps their father's recordings available.

Biography 

Johansson was a native of Söderhamn, in the Hälsingland province of Sweden. Studying classical piano as a child, he would also go on to master the guitar, organ and accordion, before turning on to swing and bebop as a teenager. He met saxophonist Stan Getz while at university. He abandoned his studies to play jazz full-time, and worked with many American jazz musicians, becoming the first European to be invited to join the Jazz at the Philharmonic package.

The years 1961 to 1968, produced a string of classic albums, which would help define his style of re-imagining traditional European folk tunes via jazz and the avant garde. These included Jazz på svenska (Jazz in Swedish) and Jazz på ryska (Jazz in Russian) which are both available in an expanded form on CD. Jazz på ungerska (Jazz in Hungarian) together with Danish Jazz violinist Svend Asmussen is the third album in that series. Jazz på svenska comprises variations on sixteen Swedish folk songs with Georg Riedel playing double bass. During this period, Johansson also made several recordings with Radiojazzgruppen.

The Grammy award winning albums Musik genom fyra sekler (Music from the past four centuries) builds on traditional Swedish melodies, but this time uses larger groups of musicians. There were also 300.000 and two trio sets, 8 Bitar and Innertrio, which have been reissued as a single CD.

With his career including film & TV music, Johansson is also best known as the composer of "Here Comes Pippi Longstocking" ("Här kommer Pippi Långstrump"), the theme song of the famous Swedish TV series, Pippi Longstocking. With lyrics by character/series creator Astrid Lindgren and sung by the series' young star Inger Nilsson, it would also be one of Johansson's last works.

In November 1968, Johansson died in a car crash on his way to a concert in a church in Jönköping, Sweden.

Influence 

American hip hop group Non Phixion sampled "Bandura" for their song "Skum". The Swedish band Opeth has claimed him as an influence on the title track for their album Heritage.

Discography

As leader

Collaborations 
With Svend Asmussen
1968: Spelar jazz på ungerska (Megafon Records)

With Radiojazzgruppen
1969: Vårdkasar (Sveriges Radio)
1970: Frostrosor (Sveriges Radio), with Georg Riedel
1991: Den korta fristen (Megafon Records)

With Alice Babs
2007: Illusion (Vax Records ), with Georg Riedels Orkester

With Stan Getz
Imported from Europe (Verve, 1958)
Stan Getz at Large (Verve, 1960)
2011: Stan Getz At Nalen (Live In The Swedish Harlem) (Riverside Records)
With Oscar Pettiford
My Little Cello (Debut, 1960)

References

External links 
 
 A very useful guide to buying Johansson issues and reissues on CD.
 [ AllMusic guide entry]
 Official YouTube channel

1931 births
1968 deaths
Road incident deaths in Sweden
Swedish jazz pianists
Folk jazz musicians
20th-century Swedish pianists
Radiojazzgruppen members
ACT Music artists
Dot Records artists